Stephen Gary "Steve" Lee is an Australian country musician and gun rights activist. In 2009 he released his first music video, I Like Guns.

Pro-gun activities
Lee is a pro-gun activist, having supported and spoken with the Shooters and Fishers Party leader Robert Borsak, and put forward many singles and statements regarding guns, gun laws, criminals and law-abiding gun owners.

Since 2009 he has been invited to America by the National Rifle Association, had his song "I Like Guns" featured in a video game, appeared in HBO's "Guns in America" and been interviewed nationally on A Current Affair. He has also released a DVD.

Lee was part of a 2014 episode of SBS Television series Living with the Enemy on hunting. Steve spent a week living at the headquarters of Animal Liberation Victoria witnessing a duck hunting protest, then vegan Felicity Andersen spent a week at Steve's home where she joined Lee and Robert Borsak on a feral pig hunt.

Politics
Steve Lee was a Shooters and Fishers Party candidate for the New South Wales Legislative Council in 2011, and in 2015.

Music
In 2009 Lee released his first music video, I Like Guns, which gained millions of views on his YouTube channel.

Discography
I Like Guns
Tracks on I Like Guns include:

I Like Guns (2:37)
The Shoot Out (3:05)
Time To Get A Gun (3:01)
Pistol In My Hand (2:39)
Devil's Right Hand (2:22)
Gun Shy Dog (1:54)
Rock Salt & Nails (4:43)
I'll Give Up My Gun (4:11)
Modern Day Bonnie & Clyde (4:25)
Don't Take Your Guns To Town (4:08)
7 Shells (3:00)
She Don't Like Guns (2:28)

Everybody  Likes Guns

Tracklist for Everybody Likes Guns:
Who Gave You The Right (2:58)
Pistols And Rifles (3:59)
Everybody Likes Guns (3:20)
I’ve Shot Every Gun (2:41)
I Cannot Shoot A Gun (3:48)
Gonna Buy Me A Gun (3:01)
Lucky Country (4:08)
I Won't Back Down (3:18)
Huntin’ Fool (3:12)
Life Is Good (Hickok 45 Song) (3:18)
A Trigger To Pull (3:32)
There's A Gun In The Kitchen (3:38)

References

Living people
Year of birth missing (living people)